Protein FAM114A1 also known as nervous system overexpressed protein 20 (NOXP20) is a protein that in humans is encoded by the FAM114A1 gene. Orthologs of FAM114A1 can be found in organisms as taxonomically distant from Homo sapiens as  Drosophila. However, as expected, human FAM114A! is more like that of primates than any other orthologs. FAM114A1 has one paralog, FAM114A2, which also encodes a protein of unknown function.

Gene 
FAM114A1 is located on the short arm of Chromosome 4 (4.p14) in humans on the forward strand sense, it starts at base pair 38869354 and ends at 38947365. Its mRNA has 4138 bp. The gene has the following neighbors on the same chromosome: 
TLR1: Toll-like receptor (TLR) 1 plays a role in pathogen recognition and activation of innate immunity.
TLR6: Toll-like receptor (TLR) 6 plays a role in pathogen recognition and activation of innate immunity.
TMEM156: The gene codes for a transmembrane protein.
KLHL5: Kelch-like 5, its protein is thought to have a role in lymphocyte activation.

Homology

Expression 

NOXP20 is over-expressed in the brain, microarray data  using the Allen Brain Atlas provides evidence of that expression.
Data from NCBI GEO Profile  shows that although FAM114A1 is expressed in the brain, its expression goes beyond the nervous tissue to include most of the tissue types in the human body.
GEO Profiles also show that FAM114A1 is more expressed in mesenchyme stem cells than in undifferentiated stem cells.
Further experiments  have shown that there are certain factors that affect the expression of FAM114A1. One example is the direct relation between the over-expression of CLDN-1 and the over-expression of FAM114A1.

Protein 

NOXP20 is made up of 563 amino acids and weighs 60742 Da with an iso-electric point of 4.415999. Little is known about the details of this protein, however, there is a good deal of scientific predictions for the protein's structure and function. Like any other protein, this protein undergoes post-translational modifications. The modification that has been proven to be true is phosphorylation on two of the protein's amino acids 196 and 199.

Structure 

There are several tools available to predict the secondary structure of a protein. One tool that combines the results of few of them is PELE on SDSC Biology WorkBench. According to this tool, the protein's secondary structure is mostly alpha helices and coils with some beta strands around the structure.

Interactions 
There is not proof of any interactions that the FAM114A1 protein has with other proteins in the human body. However, an interaction between FAM114A1 and CDGSH iron sulfur domain 2 was detected in mice.
There is 77% identity and 83% similarity between the amino acids of NOXP20 in the two species (Homo sapiens and Mus musculus). Due to the close relation between the two species we can assume that NOXP20 has the same interaction in humans.

Function 
The exact function of NOXP20 is still not well understood. However, there has been evidence that the protein carries a caspase recruiting domain on it. Knowing that caspase is involved in apoptosis, this information leads us to believe that NOXP20 could have a role in apoptosis and regulation of cell proliferation.

References

Further reading